María López Valenzuela (born 26 November 2002) is a Spanish footballer who plays as a goalkeeper for Levante.

Club career
López Valenzuela started her senior career with Granada in her city of birth. She debuted for them at only 15 years of age.

International career
Valenzuela has represented Spain at under-17 level and was in their squad for the 2018 U-17 World Cup. In February 2021, Valenzuela was called up to the Spain national team for the first time for their games against Azerbaijan and Poland. She did not play in either fixture.

References

External links
 Profile at La Liga

2002 births
Living people
Women's association football goalkeepers
Spanish women's footballers
Levante UD Femenino players
Footballers from Granada
Primera División (women) players
Segunda Federación (women) players
Granada CF (women) players
Spain women's youth international footballers